"The Snowman" (Danish: Sneemanden) is a literary fairy tale by Hans Christian Andersen about a snowman who falls in love with a stove. It was published by C.A. Reitzel in Copenhagen as Sneemanden on 2 March 1861.  Andersen biographer Jackie Wullschlager describes the tale as a lyrical and poignant complement to Andersen's "The Fir-Tree" of December 1844.

According to Anne Klara Bom and Anya Aarenstrup from the H. C. Andersen Centre of University of Southern Denmark, "it is correct to point to the very ambivalent (and also very traumatic) elements in Andersen's emotional life concerning the sexual sphere, but it is decidedly just as wrong to describe him as homosexual and maintain that he had physical relationships with men. He did not. Indeed, that would have been entirely contrary to his moral and religious ideas, aspects that are quite outside the field of vision of Wullschlager and her like."

References
Notes

Footnotes

Works cited

External links
 "The Snow Man" English translation by Jean Hersholt
 "Sneemanden" Original Danish text

1861 short stories
Short stories by Hans Christian Andersen
Christmas characters
Fictional snowmen
Male characters in literature
Literary characters introduced in 1861